Eleanor Lytle McKillip Kinzie (fl. 1800) was the great-grandmother of Juliette Gordon Low, wife of John Kinzie, and mother of John H. Kinzie.  At the age of nine, Eleanor was captured by Native Americans. She was a captive of a Seneca tribe for four years and was adopted into the family of Chief Cornplanter. He released her and her family moved to Detroit. At the age of 14, she was married to Captain McKillip, a British officer. They had a daughter named Margaret and he was later killed in 1794 by friendly fire at the future location of Fort Defiance at the Miami Rapids.

A play called The Captivity of Eleanor Lytle was presented in the children’s theater of the 1933 Chicago World’s Fair.

References

Further reading
Little Ship Under Full Sail
Wau-bun

18th-century American people
Captives of Native Americans